Cyperus mundulus is a species of sedge that is native to southern parts of Brazil.

The species was first formally described by the botanist Carl Sigismund Kunth in 1837.

See also
 List of Cyperus species

References

mundulus
Plants described in 1837
Taxa named by Carl Sigismund Kunth
Flora of Brazil